The Speel River is a river in the southeastern portion of the City and Borough of Juneau, Alaska. It begins at Speel Glacier and flows for  before entering Port Snettisham.

A pulp mill operated along the Speel River during the 1920s, which produced 40 tons of pulp per day.  The Speel Dam was proposed on the river in the 1950s and 1960s.

References

Rivers of Juneau, Alaska
Rivers of Alaska